Hrvatski nogometni klub Rijeka, commonly referred to as NK Rijeka or simply Rijeka, is a Croatian professional football club from the city of Rijeka.

HNK Rijeka compete in Croatia's top division, HT Prva liga, of which they have been members since its foundation in 1992. During the reconstruction of Stadion Kantrida, their traditional home ground has been Stadion Rujevica. Rijeka's traditional home colours are all white.

The club was founded in 1904, with the football team being active at last since 1906, and following the tumultuous political changes that swept the border city of Rijeka in the following decades, it changed its name to U.S. Fiumana in 1926, to  S.C.F. Quarnero in 1946, to NK Rijeka in 1954, and finally HNK Rijeka in 1995. Rijeka is the third-most successful Croatian football club, having won one Croatian First League title, two Yugoslav Cups, six Croatian Cups, one Croatian Super Cup, Serie C 1940-41, the Italian Federal Cup 1927-28 and the 1977–78 Balkans Cup.

History

1906–1926 
The club was founded in mid April 1904 as Club Sportivo Olimpia, by the Antonio Marchich, Aristodemo Susmel, Agesilao Satti, Carlo Colussi, Romeo and Alessandro Mitrovich, when the city of Rijeka was part of the Austro-Hungarian Empire as a Corpus Separatum of the Hungarian Crown. The club was founded as a tennis-lawn, foot-ball, swimming, cycling and athletics club. The first official activities of the football section were recorded on the 25th November 1906, with historians still investigating the football activities in the earlier years. This date is therefore currently considered the official beginning of HNK Rijeka as a football club. This also makes Rijeka the oldest still active association football club on the territory of today's Republic of Croatia.

While many clubs in town and the region had often specific ethnic leanings, Olimpia had intentionally a very international soul with Italian, Croatian, Hungarian, German players all playing and working along each other in unison. The oldest line-up known from Rijeka's pioneer years was: Duimovic, Smoivar, Penka, Brosnich, R. Mittrovich, Lenardon, Satti, Novodnik, A. Mittrovich, Paulovatz, Cittovich (captain). Initially the club played its matches on the main Scoglietto square, in front of the local Honved HQ, but moved to Kantrida stadium during the following decade (and the stadium changed its name to Campo Sportivo Olympia). Initially Olimpia played in a black and white garments, but already in the  1910s the club uses also a fully white kit.

During the following years Olimpia will be joined by several other local football clubs from the city of Rijeka, and will continue the legacy of Fiumei Atletikai Club as the main city club, when Atletico discontinued its football section in the course of the 1910s. Among the many clubs being founded in town during these years, a side in particular will soon rise as a fierce arch-rival to Olimpia: Doria (later renamed into CS Gloria) arose from the proletarian classes and the humble old town dwellers of the industry-rich port town on the Adriatic. While Olimpia was associated with the wealthier classes, mostly players from working-class families performed for Gloria, and therefore the club found most of its sympathisers among the poorer part of the population. Olimpia was renamed into Olympia on 9 January 1918 during a meeting of its board and the new president became the Fiuman writer Antonio de Schlemmer, possibly as an anti-irredentist move. During these years it achieved its first major local and international successes: it became the champion of the Free State of Fiume championship in 1921, and it won several Julian March and North-Eastern Italian championships in the following years, soon becoming the strongest side in the Alpe-Adria region.

1926–1943 
On September 2, 1926, following Mussolini's reforms of the FIGC and the 1924 Fiume putsch led by Italian fascists, which brought to the annexation of the independent Free State of Fiume to Italy, Olympia was forced to merge with its arch-rival Gloria into the Unione Sportiva Fiumana. Pietro Pasquali was picked as the new president of the club. Two years later, Fiumana won its first national trophy when it reached first place in the Italian Federal Cup.  The following season saw the club playing in the Italian Serie A, with some of the biggest Italian clubs such as Ambrosiano (today's Inter, also forced into a brand image change by the new regime), Juventus and Napoli played at the Kantrida stadium (renamed to Stadio Borgomarina in those years). Despite a decent performance in Serie A, the now impoverished by the annexation city, now cut off from its natural economic hinterland, was not in the financial position to compete with the biggest cities in Italy and following these  successes the club had to see many of its stars signed by major Italian sides. This brought the club to pass most of the '30s and '40s between the second and third tier of the Italian competitions. At the reopening of a refurbished Kantrida (then renamed Stadio del Littorio) in 1935, Fiumana hosted AS Roma, and in June 1941, it became champion of the newly created Italian Serie C.
Serie C's last season before the fall of fascist Italy in 1943 saw Fiumana end in third place. The players, mostly from workers families, leaned heavily toward the partisan movement, often joining it out right, and didn't take part in the Italian Social Republic championships and the Adriatic Littoral championship set up by the German occupational force. Nonethelss it will keep playing several matches with other local clubs and against sides organised or brought in by the German occupational authorities. Worth mentioning are the excessive celebrations for some victories against the German sides that brought several players to be imprisoned and sent to various concentration camps in German, and a last ceremonial game between the old legends of Olympia and Gloria that was held on June the 15th 1944 while allied planes were bombing the city's surroundings. Most Fiumana players will join the partisan movement and help the Yugoslav liberation movement, with many ending up in imprisonment and being sent to concentration camps for their sympathies.

1943–1954 
Following the liberation of the city from the Nazi occupation and the subsequent occupation by Yugoslav troops, and due to the uncertain future status of the city during the long Paris peace conference, the club resumed its activities in the post-war period under the slightly rebranded name of Rappresentativa Sindacale Fiumana. It went on playing several games against the most notable teams of the newly constituted Yugoslav state, beating Dinamo Zagreb 4–2, Akademičar Zagreb 7–2 and Metalac Beograd 2–0. During the interim post-war year, and prior to the first edition of the Yugoslav First League, R.S. Fiumana played against some of its future Balkan rivals. The authorities also set up an unofficial city tournament among factories named after Fiumana's late captain Giovanni Maras, who died heroically in partisan combat on the nearby Mount Risnjak. Despite Maras and most of his colleagues' partisan allegiance and the many hardships endured by them in Nazi concentration camps, the name Fiumana came soon to be considered too Italian for a city that the Yugoslav occupational authorities were trying to annex by force before the official peace treaty could be signed.

As in most other cities in Yugoslavia, in 1946 the communist authorities established a new identity for the city's most representative club in order for it to take part in the upcoming Yugoslav championship and rebranded and restructured the club into Società Cultura Fisica Quarnero (S.C.F. Quarnero), which later added also the bilingual title Sportsko Društvo Kvarner. The new name followed the geographic neutral naming conventions requested to local councils by the central authorities in Belgrade in order to approve the reestablishment of the local sport club activities and to participate in competitions. The initiative came from Ettore Mazzieri, the city's sport commissioner for the Yugoslav military administration and a previous Fiumana manager. The first match with the Quarnero identify was played on the 7th of August 1946, bringing a revenge against Hajduk Split for the loss from the previous year. The club began the new course with a resounding 2–0 against the best Yugoslav side of the time. Quarnero initially continued to play in the Fiumana amaranto colours, but started switching colours after the first few championships games, and continued appearing with new kits every few matches until season 1957–58. Luigi Sošić and in particular Giovanni Cucera took over the role of first post-war presidents shaping the new communist direction of the club, while all former Fiumana players and staff simply carried on playing in the renamed club for the next few years, before the Italian exodus slowly forced many of them to leave the city after the season 1947–48. As all clubs in Yugoslavia had to undergo a transformation into general sport clubs following the Stalinist model imposed by Belgrade in 1945, S.C.F. Quarnero incorporated 11 other sections in addition to football, including boxing, fencing, basketball and tennis. The international tennis champion Orlando Sirola started his career at the club, before his exile.

The authorities in Belgrade soon decided that Rijeka's club should be invited to participate in the first Yugoslav First League in 1946-47 as an external guest, representing the occupied Zone B of the Julian March region, but only after a play-off with the Pula-based club Unione Sportiva Operaia. When the city of Rijeka was assigned to Yugoslavia in February 1947 and Tito broke all ties with Stalin in 1948, most Yugoslav clubs underwent a further re-organisation. Thus in 1948 Quarnero became once again an all-football club, and the name was also consequently modified once more into Società Calcio Quarnero – Nogometni Klub Kvarner. During the early period playing in Yugoslavia's competitions, Kvarner reached moderate successes in various national and local leagues. Still, the club was relegated at the end of their inaugural season in the Yugoslav First League in 1946–47, due to a purely political decision to favour Ponziana, after Quarnero had already secured its stay in the first league in the course of the season. Upon securing Rijeka for Yugoslavia, the Belgrade authorities were now trying to pander to Trieste's residents through sport, in hope of annexing also that city to Yugoslavia.

The club continued to play with mixed results in the second and third leagues of Yugoslav football. The club display worse and worse results over the next ten years concurrently to Rijeka's autochthonous population slowly leaving their hometown over the years. Consequently, also the club was bleeding many of its best players year in year out, because many opted to leave Yugoslavia and move overseas.

In 1954, following rising ethnic tensions around the Triest Crisis and the subsequent elimination of all forms of bilingualism in the city, paired with a desire to have a brand more recognizable and associated the club was further renamed into NK Rijeka.

1954–1991 
Given the political interferences in the club's life and the continuous mistreatment of ethnical Italians many of Quarnero's best players were forced to join the Fiuman exodus, and the club lingered between the second and third tier of the Yugoslav competition for the next several years. Following new Italian-Yugoslav tensions that arose during the Trieste Crisis, and the subsequent de facto abolition of the city's full bilingual rights by the communist authorities in Belgrade, the club changed its name once again, into the now completely monolingual NK Rijeka (Rijeka Football Club) on the 2nd of July 1954, giving up onto the Italian language in its brand image for the first time in the club's history. Rijeka started to use a white kit for the second time in its history in a match in Šibenik in the 1957–58 second league season. During the previous seasons the kit colors were constantly being changed, depending on what was available to the management at any given time of the season and to what the sponsors were able to offer. The main kit remained white since. Rijeka returned to the First League in 1958 and remained in the top tier for 11 consecutive seasons until 1969, when it got relegated once again to the Yugoslav Second League. Despite finishing at the top in four (out of five) seasons of the second league, due to three failed play/off attempts, the club only gained a promotion back to the top tier in 1974. Rijeka remained in the top tier until the breakup of Yugoslavia in 1991, with varying but improving results.

The club's greatest success during this period are two Yugoslav Cup titles in 1978 and 1979 and a runner-up placement in 1987, when Rijeka lost the final in the penalty shoot-out. The club never managed to end higher than the fourth place in the Yugoslav First League. In 1984, the club came closest to a Yugoslav championship title, finishing only two points behind Red Star Belgrade. Rijeka were also the best placed Croatian club in the Yugoslav First League in 1965, 1984 and 1987.

1991–present 

Following the breakup of Yugoslavia, in 1992 Rijeka joined the Croatian First Football League in its inaugural season. In 1995 the club changes one final time its name to HNK Rijeka, adding the prefix "Croatian" to its name, following the example of many other clubs during the Croatian War for Independence. Today Rijeka remains one of only four founding member clubs of the HNL to have never been relegated and is regarded as one of the country's top three clubs. Since the Croatian independence, the club won its first-ever league title in 2017, ending Dinamo Zagreb's run of 11 consecutive titles, and was a runner-up in seven different seasons. In the final round of the 1998–99 season, a refereeing error denied Rijeka their first championship title. With one match to play, Rijeka were one point ahead of Croatia Zagreb, needing a home win against Osijek to secure the title. With the match tied at 1–1, in the 89th minute, Rijeka forward Admir Hasančić converted a cross by Barnabás Sztipánovics. However, moments later, assistant referee Krečak raised his flag and referee Šupraha disallowed Rijeka's winning goal for an alleged offside. Following an investigation, 3D analysis revealed Hasančić was not, in fact, in an offside position, and that Rijeka were wrongfully denied their first championship title. An investigation by Nacional revealed Franjo Tuđman, the president of the Republic of Croatia and an ardent Croatia Zagreb supporter, earlier in 1999 ordered the country's intelligence agencies to spy on football referees, officials and journalists, with the aim of ensuring the Zagreb club wins the league title.

Rijeka has also won six Croatian Cups, including back-to-back titles in 2005 and 2006 and most recently in 2019 and 2020. It won the cup also in 2014 and in 2017, which helped them secure a historic Double in that year.

HNK Rijeka in the European competitions 
Rijeka participated in UEFA competitions on 21 occasions, including nine consecutive appearances since 2013–14. The greatest success was the quarter-final of the 1979–80 European Cup Winners' Cup, where they lost to Italian giants Juventus 2–0 on aggregate. The most memorable result in Europe was the home win (3–1) against eventual winners Real Madrid in the 1984–85 UEFA Cup. Controversially, in the return leg at Santiago Bernabéu Stadium, which Rijeka lost 3–0, three of their players were sent off. Madrid scored their first goal from a doubtful penalty in the 67th minute with Rijeka already down to ten men. Over the next ten minutes, two additional Rijeka players were sent off, most notably Damir Desnica. While Desnica received the first yellow card because he did not stop play after Schoeters blew his whistle, the second yellow was issued because he allegedly insulted the referee. However, unbeknownst to the referee, Desnica had been a deaf-mute since birth. With Rijeka reduced to eight players, Madrid scored two additional goals, progressed to the next round and eventually won the trophy.

In 2013, after winning 4–3 on aggregate against VfB Stuttgart, Rijeka qualified for the 2013–14 UEFA Europa League group stage. Rijeka also participated in the 2014–15 UEFA Europa League group stage, where they defeated Feyenoord and Standard Liège and drew with title-holders and eventual winners Sevilla. In 2017, Rijeka reached the 2017–18 UEFA Champions League play-off, where they lost 3–1 on aggregate to Greek champions Olympiacos, and automatically qualified for the 2017–18 UEFA Europa League group stage. In the group stage they recorded a famous home win (2–0) against AC Milan but once again failed to progress to the knockout stages.

Private ownership 
In February 2012, Gabriele Volpi – an Italian businessman and the founder of Orlean Invest, as well as the owner of football club Spezia and water polo club Pro Recco – injected much needed capital into the club. With the privatization process complete by September 2013, Volpi, through Dutch-based Stichting Social Sport Foundation, became the owner of 70% of the club, with the City of Rijeka in control of the remaining 30%. On 29 December 2017 it was announced that chairman Damir Mišković, through London-based Teanna Limited, acquired the majority stake in the club from Stichting Social Sport Foundation.

Record transfers 
In January 2015, Rijeka sold their star striker Andrej Kramarić to Leicester City for a club-record £9.7 million transfer fee.

Historical names 

 1904 – C.S. Olimpia (Club Sportivo Olimpia)
 1918 – C.S. Olympia (Club Sportivo Olympia)
 1926 – U.S. Fiumana (Unione Sportiva Fiumana), after merger with C.S. Gloria
 1945 – R.S. Fiumana (Rappresentativa Sindacale Fiumana)
 1946 – S.C.F. Quarnero (Società Cultura Fisica Quarnero), after rebranding to partake in the Yugoslav football championships system
 1948 – S.C. Quarnero - N.K. Kvarner (Società Calcio Quarnero - Nogometni Klub Kvarner)
 1954 – N.K. Rijeka (Nogometni Klub Rijeka)
 1995 – H.N.K. Rijeka (Hrvatski Nogometni Klub Rijeka)

Stadium 

The club initially played at the Honved training field, in front of today's Popular University of Rijeka in the central Scoglietto suburb of Rijeka. During the 1920s the club was allowed to build a new and very modern for the time facility in Scoglietto, and toward the end of the decade it started using Stadium Kantrida as its main field, naming it Campo Sportivo Olympia. Kantrida was the club's traditional home ground for over 95 years (with a small hiatus between 1947 and 1951, due to refurbishing), until July 2015. With a new project for a refurbished and bigger Kantrida Stadium being presented, and the field awaiting demolition and reconstruction, in August 2015, Rijeka have been based at the newly built Stadion Rujevica, a modern all-seater with a capacity of 8,279. Stadion Rujevica is part of Rijeka's new training centre and serves as the club's temporary home ground. Following the demolition of old Kantrida, a new, state-of-the art, 14,600-capacity all-seater stadium should be built on the same location. In addition to the stadium, investors are planning to build a commercial complex that will include a shopping mall and a hotel. The project is on hold as the club is seeking funding and co-investors to make the project viable.

Support 

Rijeka's ultras group are called Armada Rijeka, or simply Armada. The group has been active since 1987, but some forms of organised (albeit not registered as associations) support were present and following the club already in the decades before, and the earliest we know reach well into the '20s of the XX. century.

During most home matches, the majority of the seats are occupied by season ticket holders. For the 2017–18 season the club had 5,922 season ticket holders and 8,403 members.

Rivalries 

Rijeka's greatest rivalry nowadays is with Hajduk Split. Since 1946, the Adriatic derby is contested between the two most popular Croatian football clubs from the Adriatic coast, Rijeka and Hajduk. Other rivalries exist with other major clubs in Croatia Dinamo Zagreb and a milder with Osijek. The main regional derby is that with Istra Pula. The origins of the Rijeka–Pula rivalry date back to the clashes between Fiumana and Grion Pola since the late 1920s. The city derby with Orijent is probably the most ancient, with its roots in the clashes between CS Olimpia and CS Gloria against Orijent and the other more successful in those early years Sušak based club, Victoria.

Kit manufacturers and shirt sponsors

Players

Current squad

Other players under contract

Youth academy

Dual registration

Out on loan

Youth system

Club officials and technical staff

Notable players 

To appear in this section a player must have satisfied all of the following three criteria:
 (1) player has at least 100 appearances in official matches, including first division (Yugoslav First League and Croatian First Football League), domestic cup (Yugoslav Cup, Croatian Cup and Croatian Supercup) and UEFA club competitions;
 (2) player has scored at least 20 goals in official matches if forward, 5 if midfielder and no goal requirement if defender or goalkeeper in first division (Yugoslav First League and Croatian First Football League), domestic cup (Yugoslav Cup, Croatian Cup and Croatian Supercup) and UEFA club competitions; and
 (3) player has played at least one international match for their national team while under contract with Rijeka.
 Otherwise, also included are 30 of the club's top scorers and most capped players in the first division.

 Ezio Loik
 Rodolfo Volk
 Mario Varglien
 Giovanni Varglien
 Luigi Ossoinach
 Andrea Kregar
 Giovanni Maras
 Ernő Egri Erbstein
 Ferenc Molnár
 Balassa Béla
 Alexander Gorgon
 Senad Brkić
 Admir Hasančić
 Zoran Kvržić
 Héber Araujo dos Santos
 Fredi Bobic 
 Filip Bradarić
 Elvis Brajković
 Antonio Čolak
 Dario Knežević
 Andrej Kramarić
 Mate Maleš
 Mladen Mladenović
 Roberto Paliska
 Dubravko Pavličić
 Mladen Romić
 Daniel Šarić
 Leonard Zuta
 Radomir Đalović
 Marko Vešović
 Roman Bezjak
 Josip Drmić
 Mario Gavranović
 Radojko Avramović
 Marijan Brnčić
 Boško Bursać
 Nikica Cukrov
 Damir Desnica
 Adriano Fegic
 Nenad Gračan
 Tonči Gulin
 Miloš Hrstić
 Janko Janković
 Marijan Jantoljak
 Srećko Juričić
 Miodrag Kustudić
 Vladimir Lukarić
 Sergio Machin
 Danko Matrljan
 Nikica Milenković
 Anđelo Milevoj
 Velimir Naumović
 Petar Radaković
 Zvjezdan Radin
 Milan Radović
 Mauro Ravnić
 Milan Ružić
 Miroslav Šugar
 Edmond Tomić
 Bruno Veselica
 Mladen Vranković
 Nedeljko Vukoje

Source: Appearances and Goals. Last updated 23 April 2022.

All-time Best 11 
According to a 2005–07 survey of former players (older than 40 years of age) and respected journalists, Marinko Lazzarich found that the best all-time team of Rijeka is as follows:

1. Jantoljak, 2. Milevoj, 3. Hrstić, 4. Radaković, 5. Radin, 6. Juričić, 7. Lukarić, 8. Gračan, 9. Osojnak, 10. Naumović, 11. Desnica.

Rijeka's daily, Novi list, in 2011 declared the following 11 players as Rijeka's best all time team:

1. Jantoljak, 2. Šarić, 3. Radin, 4. Juričić, 5. Hrstić, 6. Loik, 7. Radaković, 8. Mladenović, 9. Naumović, 10. Skoblar, 11. Desnica.

Best 11 (2010–20) 
In 2020, the club's fans voted to select the best squad over the past decade to fit in a 4–2–3–1 formation:

Prskalo – Ristovski, Župarić, Mitrović, Zuta – Kreilach, Moisés – Vešović, Andrijašević, Sharbini – Kramarić. Manager: Kek.

Managers 

 Karoly Bela (September 1926 – July 27)
 Delfino Costanzo Valle (August 1927 – July 29)
 Imre Emmerich Poszonyi (August 1929 – July 32)
 Luigi Ossoinak (August 1932 – July 33)
 Andrea Kregar (August 1933 – July 36)
 Eugen Payer (August 1936 – July 38)
 Marcello Mihalich (August 1938 – July 40)
 Angelo Piccalunga (August 1940 – July 42)
 Artur Kolisch (August 1942 – 44)
 Hans Bloch (July 1946 – August 46)
 Jozo Matošić (August 1946 – August 47)
 Ivan Smojver &  Ante Vukelić (September 1947 – October 47)
 Franjo Glaser (October 1947 – July 48)
 Zvonko Jazbec (September 1948 – December 48)
 Franjo Glaser (January 1949 – December 50)
 Slavko Kodrnja (January 1951 – December 51)
 Ljubo Benčić (January 1952 – August 52)
 Nikola Duković (September 1952 – April 53)
 Antun Lokošek (May 1953 – December 53)
 Ratomir Čabrić (January 1954 – July 54)
 Franjo Glaser (August 1954 – July 56)
 Nikola Duković (September 1956 – July 57)
 Milorad Ognjanov (September 1957 – October 59)
 Luka Kaliterna (November 1959 – May 60)
 Stojan Osojnak (May 1960 – June 61)
 Ostoja Simić (June 1961 – May 62)
 Angelo Ziković (August 1962 – December 62)
 Virgil Popescu (January 1963 – September 64)
 Stojan Osojnak (October 1964 – June 67)
 Vladimir Beara (May 1967 – November 68)
 Angelo Ziković (November 1968 – June 70)
 Ilijas Pašić (June 1970 – June 71)
 Stevan Vilotić (June 1971 – June 72)
 Marcel Žigante (June 1972 – May 73)
 Ivica Šangulin (May 1973 – June 74)
 Gojko Zec (June 1974 – June 76)
 Dragutin Spasojević (June 1976 – April 79)
 Marijan Brnčić (interim) (April 1979 – June 79)
 Miroslav Blažević (June 1979 – January 81)
 Marijan Brnčić (January 1981 – April 83)
 Josip Skoblar (May 1983 – December 86)
 Mladen Vranković (January 1987 – June 89)
 Vladimir Lukarić (June 1989 – January 91)
 Nikola "Pape" Filipović (January 1991)
 Mladen Vranković (February 1991)
 Željko Mudrovičić (March 1991 – June 91)
 Marijan Jantoljak (June 1991 – November 92)
 Srećko Juričić & Mile Tomljenović (November 1992)
 Srećko Juričić (January 1993 – June 94)
 Zvjezdan Radin (June 1994 – March 95)
 Mladen Vranković (April 1995)
 Josip Skoblar (April 1995 – June 95)
 Marijan Jantoljak (June 1995 – September 95)
 Ranko Buketa (interim) (September 1995 – October 95)
 Josip Skoblar (October 1995 – November 95)
 Miroslav Blažević &  Nenad Gračan (January 1996 – June 96)
 Luka Bonačić (June 1996 – August 96)
 Ivan Kocjančić (interim) (August 1996)
 Branko Ivanković (August 1996 – March 98)
 Nenad Gračan (March 1998 – November 2000)
 Boris Tičić (interim) (November 2000 – December 2000)
 Predrag Stilinović (December 2000 – 1 May)
 Ivan Katalinić (May 2001 – 2 May)
 Zlatko Kranjčar (May 2002 – 2 November)
 Mladen Mladenović (November 2002 – 3 March)
 Vjekoslav Lokica (March 2003 – 3 July)
 Ivan Katalinić (July 2003 – 4 May)
 Elvis Scoria (1 July 2004 – 30 September 2005)
 Dragan Skočić (1 October 2005 – 30 September 2006)
 Milivoj Bračun (1 October 2006 – 13 March 2007)
 Josip Kuže (12 March 2007 – 4 June 2007)
 Zlatko Dalić (1 June 2007 – 30 June 2008)
 Mladen Ivančić (7 July 2008 – 8 October 2008)
 Stjepan Ostojić (interim) (4 October 2008 – 13 October 2008)
 Robert Rubčić (13 October 2008 – 21 September 2009)
 Zoran Vulić (22 September 2009 – 10 November 2009)
 Nenad Gračan (10 November 2009 – 6 November 2010)
 Elvis Scoria (7 November 2010 – 16 June 2011)
 Alen Horvat (20 June 2011 – 4 October 2011)
 Ivo Ištuk (4 October 2011 – 18 March 2012)
 Dragan Skočić (19 March 2012 – 30 April 2012)
 Mladen Ivančić (interim) (30 April 2012 – 2 May 2012)
 Elvis Scoria (2 May 2012 – 24 February 2013)
 Matjaž Kek (27 February 2013 – 6 October 2018)
 Igor Bišćan (9 October 2018 – 22 September 2019)
 Simon Rožman (23 September 2019 – 27 February 2021)
 Goran Tomić (1 March 2021 – 27 May 2022)
 Dragan Tadić (20 June 2022 – 16 August 2022)
 Fausto Budicin (interim) (16 August 2022 – 5 September 2022)
 Serse Cosmi (5 September 2022 – 13 November 2022)
 Sergej Jakirović (30 November 2022 – present)

Source:

Winning managers

Presidents 

 Antonio Carlo de Schlemmer 1918–1920
 Antonio Marcich 1920–1921
 Pietro Pasquali 1921–1923
 Clemente Marassi 1923–1925
 Nino Host-Venturi 1925–1926
 Giovanni Stiglich 1926–1928
 Ramiro Antonini 1928–1929
 Oscar Sperber 1929–1931
 Costanzo Delfino 1931–1936
 Alessandro Szemere 1936–1937
 Eugenio Zoncada 1937–1938
 Alessandro Andreanelli 1938–1939
 Giuseppe Ianetti 1939–1940
 Alesandro Andreanelli 1940–1941
 Carlo Descovich 1941–1942
 Andrea Gastaldi 1942–1945
 Luigi Sošić, 1946
 Giovanni Cucera, 1946–1948
 Ambrosio Stečić, 1948–1952
 Dr. Zdravko Kučić, 1953–1954
 Milorad Doričić, 1955–1956
 Milan Blažević, 1957–1959
 Stjepan Koren, 1960–1963
 Milorad Doričić, 1964–1969
 Vilim Mulc, 1969–1971
 Davor Sušanj, 1971
 Ljubo Španjol, 1972–1978
 Zvonko Poščić, 1978–1979
 Nikola Jurčević, 1980
 Marijan Glavan, 1981
 Davor Sušanj, 1981–1984
 Stjepko Gugić, 1985–1986
 Dragan Krčelić, 1986–1989
 Želimir Gruičić, 1989–1991
 Darko Čargonja, 1991–1992
 Josip Lokmer, 1993–1994
 Krsto Pavić, 1994–1995
 Hrvoje Šarinić, 1995–1996
 Franjo Šoda, 1996–1997
 Prof. Žarko Tomljanović, 1997–2000
 Hrvoje Šarinić, Dr. Ivan Vanja Frančišković, Robert Ježić, 2000
 Robert Ježić, 2000
 Sanjin Kirigin, 2000–2002
 Duško Grabovac, 2002–2003
 Robert Ježić, 2003–2008
 Dr. Ivan Vanja Frančišković, 2008–2009
 Ivan Turčić, 2009–2011
 Robert Komen, 2011–2012
 Damir Mišković, 2012–

Source:

Seasons, statistics and records

Honours 
Rijeka has won one Croatian First Football League title, two Yugoslav Cups and six Croatian Cups, one Italian Coppa Federale. In European competitions, the club has reached the quarter-final of the Cup Winners' Cup in 1979–80, UEFA Cup Round of 32 in 1984–85, and group stages of the UEFA Europa League in 2013–14, 2014–15, 2017–18 and 2020–21. The club has also won the 1977–78 Balkans Cup.

Domestic 

Croatia
Croatian First League
 Winners: 2016–17
 Runners-up (7): 1998–99, 2005–06, 2013–14, 2014–15, 2015–16, 2017–18, 2018–19
Croatian Cup
 Winners (6): 2004–05, 2005–06, 2013–14, 2016–17, 2018–19, 2019–20
 Runners-up: (2) 1993–94, 2021–22
Croatian Super Cup
 Winners: 2014
 Runners-up: 2005, 2006, 2019

Yugoslavia
Yugoslav Second League
 Winners (6): 1952, 1957–58, 1969–70, 1970–71, 1971–72, 1973–74
Yugoslav Cup
 Winners (2): 1977–78, 1978–79
 Runners-up: 1986–87
Italy
Italian Coppa Federale
 Winners (1): 1927–28
Italian North-East league
Winners (1): 1923–24
Runners-up: 1924–25
Italian Third League
 Winners (1): 1940–41
Julian March Championship
Winners (2): 1921–22, 1922–23
Friuli and Julian March Cup
Winners (1): 1922–23
Free State of Fiume

 Fiuman championship
 Winners (1): 1920–21
 Fiuman-Julian Cup
 Winners (1): 1921

Austria-Hungary

 Grazioli Cup
 Runners-up: 1919

International 
 Balkans Cup
 Winners: 1977–78
 Runners-up: 1979–80
 The Atlantic Cup:
 Winners: 2017
Source:, Last updated 31 July 2020.

Rankings

UEFA club coefficient ranking 

The following data indicates Rijeka's coefficient rankings through the years.

(As of 1 November 2021), Source:

All time UEFA ranking: 271

European record

By competition 

Source:, Last updated on 28 July 2022.Pld = Matches played; W = Matches won; D = Matches drawn; L = Matches lost; GF = Goals for; GA = Goals against. Defunct competitions indicated in italics.

By ground 

Source:, Last updated on 21 July 2022.Pld = Matches played; W = Matches won; D = Matches drawn; L = Matches lost; GF = Goals for; GA = Goals against.

By season 
Non-UEFA competitions are listed in italics.

Last updated on 28 July 2022.Note: List includes matches played in competitions not endorsed by UEFA.† Matches played at neutral ground in Ascoli and Pisa, Italy.

Player records 
Most appearances in UEFA club competitions: 38 appearances
Zoran Kvržić
Ivan Tomečak
Top scorer in UEFA club competitions: 8 goals
Andrej Kramarić

References

External links 

Official
HNK Rijeka official website 
HNK Rijeka at UEFA.com
Unofficial
Hoću Ri 
Forza Fiume 
Supporters
Armada Rijeka official website 

 
Football clubs in Rijeka
Football clubs in Croatia
Football clubs in Primorje-Gorski Kotar County
Football clubs in Yugoslavia
Association football clubs established in 1946
1946 establishments in Croatia